Anacampsis fuscella is a moth of the family Gelechiidae. It is found in Sweden, Finland and Russia.

The wingspan is 11–14 mm. Adults are on wing from June to August.

The larvae feed on Trifolium medium.

References

Moths described in 1844
Anacampsis
Moths of Europe